Build a Nation is the eighth full-length studio album by hardcore punk pioneers Bad Brains. Released on June 26, 2007 on Megaforce Records with distribution by Oscilloscope Laboratories, it was produced by Adam Yauch of Beastie Boys, a longtime friend of the band. This album marked the 30th anniversary of the band.

Along with being available on CD, the album was also released on a yellow, green, and red multi-colored vinyl record. The photography for the album was shot by Annie Leibovitz.

In the album's opening week, it debuted at #100 on the Billboard 200.

Background
Nearly three years in production, Build a Nation is the first album of original material from Bad Brains since 1995's God of Love, as Black Dots (1996) is a collection of early recordings and I & I Survived (2002) is a remix album.

In April 2004, Beastie Boys' official website revealed that Adam Yauch would be producing Bad Brains' follow-up to God of Love. It was also announced that the band recorded it in Yauch's studio and was in mixing.

In February 2005, bassist Darryl Jenifer told Billboard that Bad Brains were in the studio recording their first proper studio album in ten years, to be released later in the year. Beastie Boy Adam Yauch also gave interviews indicating that he was producing the sessions, for which basic tracks featuring the original lineup had been recorded. Frontman H.R. was said to be on board for the new album, slated to emphasize a return to their early hardcore sound.

In November 2006, guitarist Dr. Know described on the sound of the new album. He states:

In January 2007, it was announced that Build a Nation would be the title of the album. In March of that year, it was also announced that the band signed to Megaforce Records.

On April 26, 2007, it was announced that Build a Nation would be officially released on June 26.

On May 10, 2007, the full album was leaked across the Internet.

On May 15, 2007, it was revealed that System of a Down bassist Shavo Odadjian would be directing the first video from Build a Nation. The video for the song "Give Thanks and Praises" can be seen online on the band's MySpace page as of August 2007. Director Shavo Odadjian makes an appearance at the end of the concert video with frontman H.R. The two are seen walking stageside, passing and smoking a marijuana joint.

Track listing

"Give Thanks and Praises" – 2:25
"Jah People Make the World Go Round" – 2:09
"Pure Love" – 0:56
"Natty Dreadlocks 'pon the Mountain Top" – 3:32
"Build a Nation" – 1:44
"Expand Your Soul" – 2:49
"Jah Love" – 3:07
"Let There Be Angels (Just Like You)" – 2:27
"Universal Peace" – 3:04
"Roll On" – 4:04
"Until Kingdom Comes" – 3:19
"In the Beginning" – 1:32
"Send You No Flowers" – 2:32
"Peace Be Unto Thee" – 3:54
"Married Again" (bonus track on 7" box set)

Personnel
H.R. – vocals
Dr. Know – guitar
Darryl Jenifer – bass
Earl Hudson – drums
Jamie Saft—Keyboards

References

2007 albums
Bad Brains albums
Megaforce Records albums